Garret Augustus Hobart (June 3, 1844 – November 21, 1899) was the 24th vice president of the United States, serving from 1897 until his death in 1899. Prior to serving as vice president, Hobart was an influential New Jersey businessman, politician and political operative.

Born in Long Branch, New Jersey, on the Jersey Shore, Hobart grew up in nearby Marlboro. After attending Rutgers College, Hobart read law with prominent Paterson attorney Socrates Tuttle. He both studied with Tuttle and married his daughter, Jennie. Although he rarely set foot in a courtroom, Hobart became wealthy as a corporate lawyer. Hobart served in local governmental positions, and then successfully ran for office as a Republican, serving in both the New Jersey General Assembly, where he was elected Speaker in 1874, and the New Jersey Senate, where he became its president in 1881. 

He was a longtime party official, and during the 1896 Republican National Convention, New Jersey delegates to the convention were determined to nominate him for vice president. Hobart's political views were similar to those of William McKinley, the presumptive Republican presidential candidate. With New Jersey a key state in the upcoming election, McKinley and his close adviser, future senator Mark Hanna, decided to have the convention select Hobart. The vice-presidential candidate emulated his running mate with a front porch campaign, though spending much time at the campaign's New York City office. McKinley and Hobart were elected.

As vice president, Hobart proved a popular figure in Washington and was a close adviser to McKinley. Hobart's tact and good humor were valuable to the President, as in mid-1899 when Secretary of War Russell Alger failed to understand that McKinley wanted him to leave office. Hobart invited Alger to his New Jersey summer home and broke the news to the secretary, who submitted his resignation to McKinley on his return to Washington. Hobart died on November 21, 1899 of heart disease at age 55; his place on the Republican ticket in 1900 was taken by New York Governor Theodore Roosevelt.

Early life 

Garret Augustus Hobart was born on June 3, 1844 in Long Branch, New Jersey, to Addison Willard Hobart and the former Sophia Vanderveer. Addison Hobart descended from the early colonial settlers of New England; many Hobarts served as pastors. Addison Hobart came to New Jersey to teach at a school in Bradevelt, New Jersey a small hamlet in Marlboro Township, New Jersey. His mother was descended from 17th-century Dutch settlers in New Amsterdam (today's New York City) who had moved to Long Island and then to New Jersey. When Addison and Sophia Hobart married in 1841, they moved to Long Branch, where Addison founded an elementary school. Garret was born in Long Branch on June 3, 1844. Three children survived infancy; Garret was the second of three boys.

Hobart initially attended his father's school in Long Branch. The family moved to Marlboro in the early 1850s and he was sent to the village school. Childhood tales of the future vice president describe him as an excellent student in both day and Sunday School, and a leader in boyhood sports. Recognizing his abilities, his father sent him to a well-regarded school in Freehold, but after a disagreement with the teacher, he refused to return; He then attended Middletown Point Academy, (later known as the Glenwood Institute) a prominent boarding school in Matawan, New Jersey. Hobart graduated at age 15 and his parents thought he was too young to attend college, so he remained at home for a year to study and work part-time at the Bradvelt School, the same institution that employed his father. Hobart enrolled at Rutgers College in 1860. He graduated in 1863, and was ranked third in his class. In later life, Hobart was a generous donor to Rutgers, receiving an honorary degree after becoming vice president and was elected a trustee shortly before his death.

Lawyer and part-time politician

Law practice 

After graduating from Rutgers, Hobart worked briefly as a teacher to repay loans. Although Hobart was young and in good health, he did not serve in the Union Army. Addison Hobart's childhood friend, lawyer Socrates Tuttle, offered to take Hobart into his office to study law. Tuttle was a prominent Passaic County lawyer who had served in the state legislature. Hobart supported himself by working as a bank clerk in Paterson; he later became director of the same bank. Hobart was admitted to the bar in 1866; he became a counsellor-at-law in 1871 and a master in chancery in 1872. In addition to learning law from Tuttle, Hobart fell in love with his daughter. Jennie Tuttle Hobart remembered, "When this attractive young law student appeared in our home I, then a young girl in my teens, unexpectedly played a rôle of importance by losing my heart to him". They were married on July 21, 1869. The Hobarts had long been Democrats; Garret Hobart's marriage into the Republican Tuttle family converted him. The Hobarts had four children, two of whom survived infancy. One daughter, Fannie, died in 1895; Hobart's son, Garret Jr. survived him.

Socrates Tuttle was influential in Paterson, which worked to Hobart's advantage. According to Michael J. Connolly in his 2010 article about Hobart, the future vice president "benefited greatly from Tuttle's beneficence". In 1866, the year he became a lawyer, Hobart was appointed grand jury clerk for Passaic County. When Tuttle became mayor of Paterson in 1871, he made Hobart city counsel. A year later, Hobart became counsel for the county Board of Chosen Freeholders. In 1872, Hobart ran as a Republican for the New Jersey General Assembly from Passaic County's third legislative district. He was easily elected, taking nearly two-thirds of the vote. The General Assembly was then elected annually and he was successful in winning re-election the following year, although his margin of victory was cut in half.

Early political career 

In 1874, still only age 30, he was voted Speaker of the Assembly. In 1876, he was nominated for the New Jersey Senate seat for Passaic County. He was elected to a three-year term and he was re-elected in 1879. In 1881 and 1882, he served as President of the state Senate, becoming the first man to lead both houses of the legislature. In 1883, he was the Republican nominee in the election for United States Senate—until 1913, senators were elected by state legislatures. As the Democrats were in the majority, the nomination was a way of honoring Hobart for his political service. When he was asked his feelings about the nomination, he responded, "I do not worry about things that do not come my way." The "complimentary" nomination would prove to be Hobart's only electoral defeat.

Hobart said of his involvement in public affairs, "I make politics my recreation." He devoted most of his time to a law practice which according to Hobart's legislative biography was highly profitable. He was rarely seen in a courtroom; his official biography for the 1896 campaign admitted that "he has actually appeared in court a smaller number of times than, perhaps, any lawyer in Passaic County". Hobart's real work was in advising corporations how to accomplish their aims, yet remain within the law. He also had a lucrative business acting as court-appointed receiver of bankrupt railroads, reorganizing them and restoring them to fiscal health. He often invested heavily in them; Hobart's success made him wealthy. In addition to the railroads for which he acted as receiver, he served as president of the Paterson Railway Company, which ran the city's streetcars, and as a board member for other railroads.

One reason for Hobart's success in both the private and public sectors was his genial personality. He worked well with others and was noted for tact and charm. Senator Mark Hatfield, in his book on American vice presidents, suggests that these qualities would have made Hobart successful in Washington had he run for Congress. Hatfield states that the reason why Hobart chose not to move from state to national politics before 1896 was a reluctance to leave a comfortable life and successful law practice in Paterson. Instead, Hobart continued to involve himself in party politics; he was widely regarded as Northern New Jersey's most influential Republican. Beginning in 1876, he was a delegate to every Republican National Convention in his lifetime. He was chairman of the New Jersey Republican Committee from 1880 to 1891, resigning the position as he became more deeply involved in Republican National Committee affairs. He was New Jersey's representative on the national committee after 1884, and rose to become vice chairman.

Election of 1896

Selection as candidate 

Jennie Hobart, in her memoirs, traced her suspicions that her husband might be a vice-presidential contender to a lunch she had with him at the Waldorf Hotel in New York in March 1895. During the meal, industrialist and future senator Mark Hanna interrupted them to ask what Garret Hobart thought of the possible presidential candidacy of Ohio Governor William McKinley—Hanna was one of McKinley's principal backers. Garret Hobart evaded the question, but Jennie Hobart believed the conversation to have been the first of a chain of events which elevated her husband to national office.

In November 1895, Republican John Griggs was elected governor of New Jersey; his campaign was managed by Hobart. The election of New Jersey's first Republican governor since the 1860s led to speculation in the newspapers that Hobart would be a candidate for vice president. New Jersey Republicans were anxious to nominate Hobart, both to see one of their own possibly elevated to national office, and in the hope that having Hobart on the national ticket would boost the Republican vote in New Jersey. Hobart was an attractive candidate as he was from a swing state, and the Griggs victory showed that Republicans could hope to win New Jersey's electoral votes, which they had not done since 1872. Another reason for a Hobart selection was his wealth; he could be expected to spend abundantly on his own campaign.

According to Hanna biographer Herbert Croly, Hobart, an early supporter of McKinley, helped ensure New Jersey's support for him at the Republican convention. Historian Stanley Jones, in his study of the 1896 election, stated that Hobart stopped off in Canton, Ohio, McKinley's hometown, en route to the convention in St. Louis. Jones wrote that the future vice president was selected several days in advance, after Speaker of the House Thomas Reed of Maine turned down the nomination. Croly asserted that McKinley and Hanna desired an easterner on the ticket to balance it and boost support in the Mid-Atlantic region. The conventional means of assuring this was to nominate a politician from New York, then the largest state in population. As many New York delegates supported their favorite son candidate, Governor (and former vice president) Levi P. Morton, instead of McKinley, giving the state the vice-presidential nomination would be an unmerited reward. According to Croly,

McKinley was nominated for president on the first ballot. Hobart described his subsequent first-ballot nomination for vice president as a tribute from his friends, but Hatfield noted, "it came equally as a tribute from [Hanna, who] wanted a ticket to satisfy the business interests of America, and Hobart, a corporate lawyer, fit that requirement perfectly". Although a Hobart nomination had been talked about at least since Griggs' victory the previous November, Hobart expressed reluctance in a letter to his wife from the convention: "It looks to me I will be nominated for Vice-President whether I want it or not, and as I get nearer to the point where I may, I am dismayed at the thought  ... If I want a nomination, everything is going my way. But when I realize all that it means in work, worry, and loss of home and bliss, I am overcome, so overcome I am simply miserable." Despite Hobart's expressed hesitation, he was welcomed home by a crowd of 15,000 at the Paterson Armory. City officials, feeling they had insufficient fireworks to properly honor Hobart, obtained more from New York City.

According to historian R. Hal Williams, the Republicans left St. Louis in June with "a popular, experienced [presidential] candidate, a respected vice-presidential nominee, and an attractive platform". Many Republicans were convinced the election would be fought over the issue of tariffs, and they anticipated an easy victory. On June 30, 1896, Hobart journeyed by train to Canton, where he was met at the station by his running mate. McKinley drove Hobart to the Ohioan's home, where Hobart followed McKinley in speaking to a delegation which had arrived to greet the presidential candidate. Hobart only remained in Canton a few hours before returning east. According to Magie, Hobart made the trip "to pay his respects to the head of the ticket and to consult with him upon important matters". McKinley biographer Margaret Leech recorded that the two men were friends almost as soon as they met.

Campaign 

The Panic of 1893 had led to hard times in the United States, and the effects were still felt in 1896. One proposal to cure the economic malaise was "Free Silver"; that the government would accept silver bullion and return it to the depositor, struck into silver dollars. At the time, the silver in a dollar coin was worth $.53. Implementation of the proposals would increase the money supply and cause difficulties in international trade with nations that remained on the gold standard. Proponents argued that the increased money supply would stimulate the economy. President Grover Cleveland was firmly for the gold standard, a stance which bitterly divided the Democratic Party. Most Republicans were for the gold standard, though some, mostly from the West, were "Silver Republicans". The Democrats in early July nominated for president an eloquent silver supporter, former Nebraska congressman William Jennings Bryan, whose Cross of Gold speech at the convention catapulted him to the nomination. The selection of Bryan prompted a wave of popular support for the Democrats.

Hobart was a strong supporter of the gold standard; and insisted on it remaining a major part of the Republican campaign even in the face of Bryan's surge. In his speech responding to the formal notification of his convention victory, Hobart stated, "An honest dollar, worth 100 cents everywhere, cannot be coined out of 53 cents worth of silver plus a legislative fiat. Such a debasement of our currency would inevitably produce incalculable loss, appalling disaster, and National dishonor." McKinley was not as strong a supporter of the gold standard as Hobart and considered modifying some of Hobart's expressed views on the gold standard before the acceptance was printed for public distribution. Hobart insisted on it being printed without change, writing, "I think I know the sentiment of Eastern men better than you can, and with this knowledge and my convictions I must retain the statements as I have written them." According to Connolly, "Though a protectionist, Hobart believed the money issue, not tariffs, led to a November Republican victory, and, in denouncing silver, his rhetoric far outstripped [that of] William McKinley."

Together with Pennsylvania Senator Matthew Quay, Hobart ran the McKinley campaign's New York office, often making the short journey from Paterson for strategy meetings. The vice-presidential candidate emulated McKinley in giving speeches from his front porch; unlike McKinley he also addressed rallies. In October, he made a short tour of New Jersey to campaign, expressing relief to his wife when it came to a close. On November 3, 1896, the voters cast their ballots in most states; a nervous Hobart spent the day at his office. Special telegraph wires had been attached to his home; at 8:30 in the evening, they conveyed the news to him that McKinley and Hobart had won. The Republican ticket won New Jersey, together with the entire Northeast. The following week, Vice President-elect Hobart attended Rutgers' 130th-anniversary celebrations as guest of honor. The member of the Class of 1863 was now Rutgers' most prominent graduate.

Vice presidency (1897–1899) 

Hobart spent much of the four months between election and inauguration reading about the vice presidency, preparing for the move, and winding down some business affairs. He did not, however, resign from the boards of corporations which would not have business before the federal government. "It would be highly ridiculous for me to resign from the different companies in which I am officer and a stockholder whose interests are not in the least affected, or likely to be, by my position as Vice President." On March 2, 1897 Hobart and his family left Paterson to travel to Washington by special train. On March 4, he was inaugurated as vice president in the Senate Chamber. The Chicago Daily News predicted, "Garret A. Hobart will not be seen or heard until, after four years, he emerges from the impenetrable vacuum of the Vice Presidency."

Presidential advisor 
Upon moving to Washington, the Hobarts established themselves at the Arlington Hotel, which was the Washington home to many political men of the era, including Hanna. Soon, however, Senator Don Cameron of Pennsylvania, who was retiring from office at the time of Hobart's inauguration, offered them the lease of the house he owned at 21 Madison Place, diagonally across Pennsylvania Avenue from the Executive Mansion (as the White House was still formally known). The asking price was $10,000 per year; the vice president bargained Cameron down to $8,000 (equal to the vice-presidential salary) by suggesting that the public might assume he stole the excess. Among the frequent visitors at what came to be known as the "Cream White House" was Hanna, by then a senator, who would come by for breakfast and talk with the vice president until it was time for both to go to the Senate.

 

The president and vice president were already friends from the campaign; after the inauguration, a close relationship grew between the two men and their wives. The First Lady, Ida McKinley, had health issues, and could not stand the strain of the required official entertaining. Jennie Hobart often substituted for the first lady at receptions and other events, and also was a close companion, visiting her daily. The Hobarts and McKinleys visited each other's home without formality; according to Jennie Hobart, writing in 1930, "it was an intimate friendliness that no vice president and his wife, before or since, have had the privilege of sharing with their chief administrator." The Hobarts often entertained at their house, which was useful to McKinley, who could attend and meet informally with congressmen without placing strain on his wife with a White House function. McKinley, who had become insolvent while governor of Ohio, turned over a portion of his presidential salary to Hobart to invest.

The vice president had in recent administrations been considered a relatively low-level political functionary, whose activities were generally limited to the constitutional function of presiding over the Senate. Hobart, however, became a close adviser to McKinley and his Cabinet members, although he was not called upon to attend Cabinet meetings. Reporter Arthur Wallace Dunn wrote of Hobart in 1922, "for the first time in my recollection, and the last for that matter, the Vice President was recognized as somebody, as a part of the Administration, and as a part of the body over which he presided".

Through late 1897 and early 1898, many Americans called for the United States to intervene in Cuba, then a Spanish colony revolting against the mother country. These calls greatly increased in February 1898, when the American battleship Maine sank in Havana harbor after an explosion. McKinley sought delay, hoping to settle the disputes peacefully, but in April 1898, Hobart told the President that the Senate would act against Spain whether McKinley liked it or not. McKinley gave in; Congress declared war on April 25, beginning the Spanish–American War, and Hobart sent McKinley a pen with which to sign the declaration.

"Assistant President" 

Hobart was more assertive as Senate president than his predecessors had been. It was customary for the vice president not to rule on disputed points, but to submit them to a vote. Hobart, with his experience as a presiding officer in the New Jersey Legislature, took a more assertive role, ruling on disputes, and trying to expedite legislation. Hobart was initially diffident in his role, feeling himself unproven beside longtime national legislators, but soon gained self-confidence, writing in a letter that "I find that I am as good and as capable as any of them. If they know a whole lot of things I don't know, I also know a whole lot of things they don't know. And there is a common humanity running through them all that makes us all as one, after all." Hobart was so successful at guiding the administration's legislative agenda through the Senate that he became known as the "assistant President".

Hobart was constant in his attendance at the Senate; one onlooker called him a "chronic audience". Vice President Hobart cast his tie-breaking vote only once, using it to defeat an amendment which would have promised self-government to the Philippines, one of the possessions which the United States had taken from Spain after the war. Hobart was instrumental in securing the ratification of the Treaty of Paris, which ended the war; according to McKinley biographer H. Wayne Morgan, Hobart was "almost the president's alter ego, [turning] every screw with his legendary politeness".

One post which Hobart refused to relinquish upon his inauguration was his position as one of three Joint Traffic Association (JTA) arbiters. The association was a group of railroads which sought to coordinate rates; if two railroads applied rates in different ways, the matter was settled by Hobart and two other arbiters. Hobart heard appeals while vice president. An October 1897 Supreme Court decision signaled that the JTA was likely to be found in violation of the Sherman Anti-Trust Act (it was, the following year) and Hobart resigned as arbiter in November 1897. Hobart was a major investor in the Ramapo Water Company; he had interests in many New York and New Jersey water utilities. In mid-1899, there was controversy over the so-called "Ramapo Scheme", whereby the Ramapo Water Company, which owned large tracts of land in the Catskill Mountains, would sell New York City $5 million in water per year for 40 years at high rates. The proposal was never agreed to, and a Republican-controlled investigating committee found no wrongdoing, but Hobart's role in the company was widely discussed in the press.

Illness and death 

By late 1898, Hobart had fallen ill with a serious heart ailment, which he at first concealed from the public. He continued Senate duty, but nearly collapsed after delivering an address closing the session. He accompanied the president on a vacation trip to Hanna's winter home in Thomasville, Georgia, but quickly contracted the flu and returned to Washington. By April 1899, Hobart's illness was well known in the press, though Hanna assured the newspapers that Hobart would be on the ticket in 1900: "nothing but death or an earthquake can stop the re-nomination of Vice President Hobart". Hobart rented a home in his birthplace of Long Branch, then an upscale Jersey Shore resort. Doctors prescribed complete rest, and the vice president amused himself by feeding two pet fish, a gold one named McKinley and a silver one named Bryan.

Despite his vice president's ill health, McKinley called upon him to break the news to Secretary of War Russell Alger that McKinley wanted him to resign—the secretary had ignored or misunderstood repeated hints from the president. According to McKinley biographer Margaret Leech, "The president did not show his usual hypersensitive regard for other people's feelings in handing over to a sick man a disagreeable task which it was his own duty to perform." Hobart invited Alger to Long Branch for the weekend, and broke the news; Alger duly submitted his resignation to McKinley. Hobart's condition worsened within days of the Alger visit, and he was soon bedridden. New York's The Sun attributed Alger's resignation to Hobart's "crystal insight" and "velvet tact"; after which Hobart wrote to McKinley, "My 'crystal insight' is still clear, but the nap is slightly worn off my velvet tact".

After a vacation with the McKinleys on Lake Champlain, Hobart returned to Paterson in September. On November 1, 1899, the government announced that Hobart would not return to public life. His condition deteriorated rapidly, and he died on November 21, 1899, at age 55. President McKinley told the family, "No one outside of this home feels this loss more deeply than I do."

New Jersey Governor Foster Voorhees ordered that state buildings be draped in mourning for 30 days, and that flags be flown at half staff until Hobart's funeral. Hobart's home, Carroll Hall, was opened to the public for four hours so that citizens might pass by his open casket; 12,000 people did so. Hobart was laid to rest at Cedar Lawn Cemetery in Paterson after a large public funeral, attended by President McKinley and many high government officials. Although the large government delegation meant that few local people could attend the service, a crowd of 50,000 came to Paterson to honor Hobart.

The mausoleum over the grave was erected in 1901. His wife purchased eleven plots adjoining the family plot to accommodate the structure. The building has massive marble columns in the front with a heavy metal door; on the back above the sarcophagus is a stained glass window. There are two sarcophagi in the center of the building, for Garret Hobart and his wife. Around the tomb are niches for other members of the family. At the time of construction in 1901, the mausoleum cost about $80,000.

Legacy 

Hobart significantly expanded the powers of the vice presidency, becoming a presidential adviser, and taking a leadership role as president of the Senate. Between his advisory and leadership roles, he was perhaps the most influential vice president since Martin Van Buren. Although Magie, writing in 1910, stated that Hobart's death "fixed his memory at the height of his fame", the former vice president is today little remembered. According to Hatfield, he is best known for his death, clearing the way for the ascent of New York Governor Theodore Roosevelt, who took Hobart's place on the Republican ticket in 1900 and succeeded as president after McKinley's assassination in 1901.

A statue of Hobart, erected in 1903, stands outside Paterson's city hall. The communities of Hobart, Oklahoma, and Hobart, Washington, are named after the former vice president. Connolly finds Hobart to be very much a man of his times:

Electoral history 

* Incumbent

References 

Bibliography

 
 
 
 
 
 
 
 
 
 
 
 
 

Other sources

External links 

 U.S. Senate biography
 
 
 
 

|-

|-

|-

|-

1844 births
1899 deaths
19th-century vice presidents of the United States
1896 United States vice-presidential candidates
Chairmen of the New Jersey Republican State Committee
New Jersey lawyers
Republican Party New Jersey state senators
People from Keyport, New Jersey
Politicians from Long Branch, New Jersey
Politicians from Paterson, New Jersey
Presidents of the New Jersey Senate
Republican Party (United States) vice presidential nominees
Republican Party vice presidents of the United States
Rutgers University alumni
Speakers of the New Jersey General Assembly
Republican Party members of the New Jersey General Assembly
Vice presidents of the United States
McKinley administration cabinet members
Burials at Cedar Lawn Cemetery
Articles containing video clips
American lawyers admitted to the practice of law by reading law